Bone morphogenetic protein 5 is a protein that in humans is encoded by the BMP5 gene.

The protein encoded by this gene is member of the TGFβ superfamily. Bone morphogenetic proteins are known for their ability to induce bone and cartilage development. BMP5 may play a role in certain cancers. Like other BMP's BMP5 is inhibited by chordin and noggin. It is expressed in the trabecular meshwork and optic nerve head and may have a role in the development and normal function. It is also expressed in the lung and liver.

This gene encodes a member of the bone morphogenetic protein family which is part of the transforming growth factor-beta superfamily. The superfamily includes large families of growth and differentiation factors. Bone morphogenetic proteins were originally identified by an ability of demineralized bone extract to induce endochondral osteogenesis in vivo in an extraskeletal site. These proteins are synthesized as prepropeptides, cleaved, and then processed into dimeric proteins. This protein may act as an important signaling molecule within the trabecular meshwork and optic nerve head, and may play a potential role in glaucoma pathogenesis. This gene is differentially regulated during the formation of various tumors.

References

External links

Further reading 

 
 
 
 
 
 
 
 
 
 
 
 
 
 

Bone morphogenetic protein
Developmental genes and proteins
TGFβ domain